Olosega County is a county in the Manu'a District in American Samoa. It was the result of the subdivision of the prior Luanuu County in two, with the other newly created county being Ofu, first reported on the 1930 U.S. Census. It contains the two villages of Olosega and Sili.

Demographics

Olosega County was first recorded beginning with the 1930 U.S. Census. It had previously been within Luanuu County. Its population zenith was in 1950 with 545 residents and has since declined to just 177 residents as of 2010.

Villages
Olosega
Sili

References 

 

Populated places in American Samoa